The Habsburg Empire of Charles V and its allies conquered Tunis in 1535, wresting the city away from the control of the Ottoman Empire.

Background
In 1533, Suleiman the Magnificent ordered Hayreddin Barbarossa, whom he had summoned from Algiers, to build a large war fleet in the arsenal of Constantinople. Altogether 70 galleys were built during the winter of 1533–1534, manned by slave oarsmen, including 2,000 Jewish  ones. With this fleet, Barbarossa conducted aggressive raids along the coast of Italy, until he conquered Tunis on 16 August 1534, ousting the local ruler, theretofore subservient to the Spanish, Muley Hasan.  Barbarossa thus established a strong naval base in Tunis, which could be used for raids in the region, and on nearby Malta.

Charles V assembled a large army of some 30,000 soldiers, 74 galleys (rowed by chained Protestants shipped in from Antwerp), and 300 sailing ships, including the carrack Santa Anna and the Portuguese galleon São João Baptista (the most powerful ship in the world at the time) to drive the Ottomans from the region. The expense involved for Charles V was considerable, and at 1,000,000 ducats was on par with the cost of Charles' campaign against Suleiman on the Danube. Unexpectedly, the funding of the conquest of Tunis came from the galleons sailing in from the New World, in the form of a 2 million gold ducats treasure extracted by Francisco Pizarro in exchange for his releasing of the Inca king Atahualpa (whom he nevertheless executed on 29 August 1533).

Despite a request by Charles V, Francis I denied French support to the expedition, explaining that he was under a three-year truce with Barbarossa following the 1533 Ottoman embassy to France. Francis I was also under negotiations with Suleiman the Magnificent for a combined attack on Charles V, following the 1534 Ottoman embassy. Francis I only agreed to Pope Paul III's request that no fight between Christians occur during the time of the expedition.

Battle 
Having sailed from Sardinia at the head of a Catholic coalition, protected by a Genoese fleet, Charles V destroyed Barbarossa's fleet on 1 June 1535 and, after a costly yet successful siege at La Goletta, captured Tunis. In the action, the Portuguese galleon São João Baptista distinguished itself by breaking the chains protecting the harbour's entrance, thereafter opening fire on La Goletta. In the ruins, the Spanish found cannonballs with the French fleur-de-lis mark, evidence of the contacts stemming from the Franco-Ottoman alliance.

The resulting massacre of the city left an estimated 30,000 dead. Barbarossa managed to flee to Algiers with a troop of several thousand Ottomans. Muley Hasan was restored to his throne. The stench of the corpses was such that Charles V soon left Tunis and moved his camp to Radès.

The siege demonstrated the power projection of the Habsburg dynasties at the time; Charles V had under his control much of southern Italy, Sicily, Spain, the Americas, Austria, the Netherlands, and lands in Germany. Furthermore, he was Holy Roman Emperor and had de jure control over much of Germany as well.

Ottoman defeat in Tunis motivated the Ottoman Empire to enter into a formal alliance with France against the Habsburg Empire. Ambassador Jean de La Forêt was sent to Constantinople, and for the first time was able to become permanent ambassador at the Ottoman court and to negotiate treaties.

Charles V celebrated a neo-classical triumph "over the infidel" first in Sicily and then at Rome on 5 April 1536 in commemoration of his victory at Tunis. The Spanish governor of La Goulette, Luys Peres Varga, fortified the island of Chikly in the lake of Tunis to strengthen the city's defences between 1546 and 1550.

Aftermath 

Barbarossa managed to escape to the harbour of Bône, where a fleet was waiting for him. From there, he sailed to accomplish the Sack of Mahón, where he took 6,000 slaves and brought them to Algiers.

The Ottomans recaptured the city in 1574. Thereafter the Ottoman governors of Tunis were semi-autonomous beys, who acted as privateers against Christian shipping. Consequently, raiding in the Mediterranean continued until the suppression of the Barbary pirates in the early 19th century. A French invasion led to the establishment of French Algeria in 1830; France would create a protectorate over Tunisia in 1881.

Gallery

See also 
 Barbary corsairs
 Capture of Tunis (1569)
 Conquest of Tunis (1574)
 Algiers expedition (1541)
 Siege of Castelnuovo
 Battle of Djerba
 Great Siege of Malta
 Battle of Lepanto
 Battle of Preveza
 Ottoman–Habsburg wars
 Ottoman–Portuguese conflicts

Notes

References 
 Allen, Bruce Ware. "Emperor vs. Pirate Tunis, 1535." MHQ: Quarterly Journal of Military History (Winter 2014) 26#2 pp 58-63.
 Battle: a Visual Journey Through 5000 Years of Combat. Grant, R. G. 2005
 Roger Crowley, Empires of the sea, 2008 Faber & Faber 
 Garnier, Edith L'Alliance Impie Editions du Felin, 2008, Paris  
 La Marina Cántabra. Ballesteros-Beretta, Antonio. 1968

External links
 Interview
 Cervantes Virtual

Tunis
Tunis (1535)
Tunis (1535)
Tunis (1535)
Tunis (1535)
16th century in Tunisia
Military history of Tunisia
History of Tunis
Tunis
Tunis
1535 in the Ottoman Empire
1535 in Africa
Tunis
Tunis
Tunis